This is a list of notable alumni and faculty of Indian Institute of Technology (BHU) Varanasi.

Notable alumni

Business

Politics and civil services

Science and technology

Other Academia

Arts

Humanities and society

Others

Notable faculty

References 

IIT